Cornelio H. Velásquez (born September 28, 1968, in Panama City, Panama) is a jockey in American Thoroughbred horse racing. He was introduced to horse racing at age fifteen by trainer Carlos Salazar Guardia in his native Panama and enrolled in the national jockey school. In his first year of racing he was his country's top apprentice jockey and was the leading rider again in 1994 and 1995.

In 1996 Cornelio Velasquez emigrated to the United States to race at Elmont, New York's Belmont Park. During the ensuing ten years he competed at meets at tracks in Kentucky and Florida, winning several riding titles. His big break came in 2003 when he won his first Breeders' Cup on Cajun Beat in the Breeders' Cup Sprint. A two-time winner of Breeders' Cup races, in 2005 Velasquez rode Closing Argument to a second-place finish in the Kentucky Derby and in 2007 is scheduled to compete on the well-regarded colt, Nobiz Like Shobiz.

References
 Cornelio Velasquez at the NTRA

Year-end charts

1968 births
Living people
Sportspeople from Panama City
Panamanian jockeys
American jockeys
Panamanian emigrants to the United States